The Congo puffer or potato puffer (Tetraodon miurus) is a freshwater pufferfish found in areas of the Congo River in Africa, including rapids.

The T.miurus populations in the wild are still healthy in suitable habitats and it is considered 'Least Concern' by the IUCN

Tetraodon miurus can grow to an approximate  length of 15 cm.  

They are inactive fishes, spending most of their time buried in sand or other substrate, with the ability to adapt their colouration to hide from potential prey.  However, many colour variations are seen within the species, ranging from black to sandy to bright red. It will not change to blue, though, but if in a dark substrate will generally become darker in color.

Like all members of the genus Tetraodon, the Congo puffer is capable of inflating itself with water or air when stressed or otherwise frightened. It also has a deadly toxin like most species.

In captivity
Tetraodon miurus require a tank with at least 60cm in length, 40cm depth and 30cm tall.

It is important that the T.miurus is provided with a very soft, sand substrate - at least 5cm deep -  so the fish is able to exhibit its natural wallowing behaviour.

Diet 
Tetraodon miurus is primarily a piscivore,
feeding mostly on smaller fish and maybe small amphibians.
In captivity it is recommended to feed them a diet of 30% frozen thawed, thiaminase free freshwater fish and 70% earthworms, cockroaches and small terrestrial isopods

References

Congo puffer
Fauna of Central Africa
Taxa named by George Albert Boulenger
Congo puffer